This is a partial list of Korean boxers.

Yuh Myung-woo, 2-time WBA light flyweight boxing champion with a record of 38 wins and only 1 loss
Kim Ji-won (boxer), unbeaten world champion. He is one of just fifteen world boxing champions to retire without a loss
Baik Hyun-man, Heavyweight boxer who won the silver medal in Olympics in 1988 
Jung Koo Chang, former light flyweight boxing champion
In Jin Chi, WBC featherweight champion 2004
Chong-Pal Park, South Korean former professional boxer who held the IBF, WBA and lineal titles at super-middleweight.
Baek In-chul, Super middleweight division who held the World Boxing Association and Lineal super middleweight championship.
Hong Chang Su, former WBC and lineal super flyweight champion
Duk Koo Kim, South Korean boxer who died after his last fight
Song Guk Kim, 2004 Summer Olympics and won the silver medal
Kim Un-chol, 2000 Summer Olympics and won the bronze medal
Ki Soo Kim, the first South Korean world champion
Hong Soo-hwan, captured the Lineal and WBA bantamweight title
Yum Dong-kyun, former Lineal and WBC junior featherweight champion.
Yuh Hwan-kil, inaugural IBF Super Featherweight champion
Kim Won-il (boxer), win the gold medal in the men's bantamweight division at the Asian Games 2002. Defeating Abdusalom Khasanov and Bekzod Khidirov in the final.

See also
List of Koreans

External links
History of early Korean boxing

Boxers
 
Korean